Albert Adams Reed (16 November 1846 – 8 May 1931) was an English cricketer active from 1867 to 1873 who played for Sussex. He was born in Sompting, Sussex and died in Littlehampton. He appeared in 27 first-class matches as a righthanded batsman who bowled right arm medium pace with a roundarm action. He scored 620 runs with a highest score of 70 not out and took 23 wickets with a best performance of five for 28.

Notes

1846 births
1931 deaths
English cricketers
Sussex cricketers
United South of England Eleven cricketers
People from Littlehampton
Players of the South cricketers
People from Sompting